Chavarzaq (also known as Chauriz and Chavarza) is a village in Mojezat Rural District, in the Central District of Zanjan County, Zanjan Province, Iran. At the 2006 census, its population was 1,538, in 363 families.

References 

Populated places in Zanjan County